Congratulations (translit. 1000 Mabrook read as Alf Mabrook or a Thousand Congratulations) is a 2010 Egyptian film directed by Ahmed Nader Galal, played by Ahmed Helmy, a man who wakes up one morning to discover that the day repeats, a carbon copy of the day before, trapping him in an inescapable vicious circle. This man has dream to live for 100 years, however, he is living for one day only and that day keep repeating to show him the negative and positive things in his life.

Plot 
The film revolves around Ahmed Galal, an irresponsible, egotistical accountant working in a stock-trading company. At the beginning of the film, he is portrayed as a man who has no limits; a man who can fire employees just to maximize profits and who deals with his family with such carelessness that he is entirely out of touch with what is happening in their lives. The events of the film take place on Ahmed's wedding day, which goes horribly wrong. He wakes up to experience the usual domestic routine: His father shouting at him to get out of the bathroom, his mother complaining of the workload, and his customary bickering with his sister. In the street, he witnesses a burglary but doesn't bother to stop the thief. On his way back from work, he finds himself wrongly accused of a hit-and-run he didn't commit. The onlookers persuade him into taking the victim to the hospital. After going to the police station, he finds that his car has been seized by the authorities. The climax is when, crossing the street, a huge truck hits him and he dies.

Well, technically, he doesn't. He wakes up the next day, initially assuming that what has happened in the past 24 hours was a dream, before he experiences the same day all over again, meeting the same exact characters, having the same conversations and witnessing these unchanged incidents.

Cast
 Ahmed Helmy as  Ahmed Galal 
 Mahmoud Fishawi as Ahmed's father
 Laila Ezz El-Arab as Ahmed's mother
 Sara Abdulrahman as Ahmed's sister
 Mohamed Farag as Karim
 Rahma Hassan as Sara

See also
 List of films featuring time loops

References

External links
 

2009 films
2000s Arabic-language films
Films set in Egypt
2009 comedy films
Egyptian comedy films